A snowflake is a particle of snow.

Snowflake(s) may also refer to:

Arts and entertainment

Film
 Snowflake (2011 film), Japanese romance and mystery film
 Snowflake (2014 film), Italian short film
 Snowflake (2017 film), German film
 Snowflake, the White Gorilla, 2011 Spanish animated live-action adventure comedy film

Music
 Snowflake (EP) by GFriend
 "Snowflake" (Kate Bush song)
 Snowflakes (album) by Toni Braxton
 "Snowflake", a single by Jim Reeves
 "Snowflakes", a single by British singer Mandy Miller
 "Snowflakes", a song by Just Jack
 "Snowflakes", a single by Canadian singer Tom MacDonald strongly referencing Snowflakes

Food and food preparation
 Cadbury Snowflake, Snow Flake or know as Flake Snow is a discontinued Chocolate by Cadbury Flake (chocolate bar)  Chocolate.

Organisms
 Leucojum, a genus of bulbous plants
 Acis (plant), a genus formerly included in Leucojum
 Snowflake (gorilla), an ape

Transportation
 Snowflake (airline) 
 HMS Snowflake (K211), a World War II Flower-class corvette

Science and technology
 Koch snowflake, a mathematical curve
 Snowflake Inc.  a company that provides a data cloud 
 Snowflake schema, a term in computer database systems
 Snowflake ID, a method of generating unique identifiers used by Twitter
 Snowflake (software), a tool by Tor (network) to defeat internet censorship.

Places

Canada 
 Snowflake, Manitoba

United States 
 Snowflake, Arizona
 Snowflake, Virginia
 Snowflake, West Virginia

Other uses
 Snowflake (fairy tale), a character in Russian fairy tales
 Snowflake (heraldry), a heraldic charge
 Snowflake (slang), a term for an overly sensitive person with an unwarranted sense of entitlement
 Snowflakes (ballet), a 1911 adaptation of the Nutcracker
 Snowflake (prison), a common name of the Russian supermax prison in the Far East
 Snowflake Inc., a cloud-based data-warehousing software company
 Carlton D. Wall House, Plymouth, Michigan, also known as Snowflake
 A type of Bobbin lace mesh

See also
 Snowflake Bentley (book), a 1998 children's book by Jacqueline Briggs Martin
 Generation Snowflake, a derogatory term referring to the young adults of the 2010s who are perceived as quicker to take offence and less resilient than previous generations